Bob Block (20 July 1921 – 17 April 2011) was a British radio and television comedy scriptwriter.

Career
His earliest work was for radio, best known for co-writing the domestic sitcom Life with the Lyons for Ben Lyon, as well as working with Arthur Askey and Frankie Howerd.

Block was best known for writing television comedy series for children, including Pardon My Genie (1972–73), Robert's Robots (1974–75), Galloping Galaxies (1985) and the BBC's Rentaghost (1976–84).

Notable credits

Radio
Variety Bandbox (1940s–1950s)Radio Rinso (1950)The Starlight Hour (1950)Life with the Lyons (1951–1961)Festival of Britain (1951)Arthur's Inn (1952) Discord in Three Flats (1962)

TelevisionOur House (1960)That's My Boy (1963)Crackerjack (1964–1973)Hey Presto It's Rolf (1966)Broaden Your Mind (1968–1969)Ken Dodd and the Diddymen (1969–1970)The Dave King Show (1969–1970)Dave Allen At Large (1970–1979) Pardon My Genie (1972–1973)Roberts Robots (1973–1974)Truscott's LuckRentaghost (1975–1984)Grandad (1979–1984)Galloping Galaxies! (1985–1986)

Music hallKindly Leave the Stage'' (1968)

External links

Official Site via Wayback Archive

References 

1921 births
2011 deaths
British children's writers
British radio writers
British male screenwriters
English television writers
British male television writers